Pocket Creek is a  long 3rd order tributary to the Deep River in Lee County, North Carolina.  The longest covered bridge (Gilliam Park Covered Bridge) in North Carolina crosses this creek.

Course
Pocket Creek rises in a pond in White Hill, North Carolina and then flows north to join the Deep River about 1.5 miles south of Gulf, North Carolina.

Watershed
Pocket Creek drains  of area, receives about 47.9 in/year of precipitation, has a wetness index of 390.19 and is about 63% forested.

See also
List of rivers of North Carolina

External links
Longest Covered Bridge in North Carolina

References

Rivers of North Carolina
Rivers of Lee County, North Carolina